St Leonard's School Boat Club is a rowing club on the River Wear, based at Prebends Bridge, Durham, County Durham.

History
The club was founded in the early 1970s and belongs to the St Leonard's Catholic School, Durham

The club has produced multiple British champions.

Honours

British champions

References

Sport in County Durham
Rowing clubs in England
Rowing clubs of the River Wear
Scholastic rowing in the United Kingdom